Panormos (previously called also Ano Kisseli) is a village of the municipality of Dorida in the prefecture of Phocis, Greece, built at an altitude of 90 meters. It is a small village with 88 inhabitants according to the 2011 census.

Archaeological remains
The architectural remains on the slopes of Mt. Profitis Ilias at the settlement of Panormos are identified with the ancient Phaestino, a town of west Locris where the important sanctuary of Apollo in Phaestino was situated. Important finds from the broader region attest to the importance of the site in antiquity: a rich classical burial in Pithos, found at Lousa; an ancient defense tower to the northwest of the village; and a considerable number of manumission inscriptions, according to which a slave was "sold" to the god within the precinct of the temple of Apollo. This "sale" of slaves in the presence of witnesses was a widespread practice of manumitting in Central Greece, and particularly in Delphi.

References

Populated places in Phocis

de:Panormos (Fokida)